Vitali Kozmin (born 14 June 1986) is an Estonian dancer and choreographer. He is best known for his role as a professional dancer on Irish and Turkish versions of Dancing with the Stars.

Career 
Kozmin has represented his country at the World and European Latin-American Championships. He has also been a finalist in the IDSF Amateur European Union Latin Championship and WDSF World Showdance Latin Championship in 2015.

In 2015, Kozmin joined the Burn the Floor cruise tour.

Dancing with the Stars

Turkey (Yok Böyle Dans)

In 2011, Kozmin was announced as one of the professional dancers for Yok Böyle Dans, the Turkish version of Dancing with the Stars. Kozmin was paired with fashion designer, Eda Taşpınar. They reached the final of the competition finishing in third place.

In 2012, Kozmin returned for the second, and final, season of Yok Böyle Dans. He was paired with model and beauty queen, Özge Ulusoy. Kozmin and Ulusoy won the competition.

Ireland 

In 2017, Kozmin was announced as one of the professional dancers for the first series of Dancing with the Stars. He was partnered with actress, Aoibhín Garrihy. On the 26 March 2017, Garrihy and Kozmin reached the final of the competition, they finished as joint runners-up, alongside Denise McCormack and Ryan McShane losing to Kerry footballer, Aidan O'Mahony and, Kozmin's wife, Valeria Milova.

In 2018, Kozmin was partnered with model, Alannah Beirne. They reached the ninth week of the competition, finishing in sixth place.

In 2019, Kozmin was partnered with Fair City actress, Clelia Murphy. They reached the quarterfinals of the competition, finishing in fifth place.

Highest and Lowest Scoring Per Dance

1 These scores was awarded during Switch-Up Week.

Series 1 

 Celebrity partner
 Aoibhín Garrihy; Average: 27; Place: 2nd

Series 2 

 Celebrity partner
 Alannah Beirne; Average: 24.9; Place: 6th

Series 3 

 Celebrity partner
 Clelia Murphy; Average: 22.7; Place: 5th

Personal life 
Kozmin is married to dancer and fellow-Dancing with the Stars cast member, Valeria Milova. They have a two children together, a son, Konstantin and a daughter, Kira.

References 

1986 births
Living people
Ballroom dancers
Estonian people of Russian descent
People from Tallinn